Hamilton Township is a township in McKean County, Pennsylvania, United States.  The population was 549 at the 2020 census.

Geography

Demographics

As of the census of 2000, there were 637 people, 288 households, and 180 families residing in the township.  The population density was 8.8 people per square mile (3.4/km2).  There were 623 housing units at an average density of 8.7/sq mi (3.3/km2).  The racial makeup of the township was 98.90% White, 0.16% African American, 0.16% Native American, and 0.78% from two or more races. Hispanic or Latino of any race were 0.31% of the population.

There were 288 households, out of which 24.3% had children under the age of 18 living with them, 51.7% were married couples living together, 8.0% had a female householder with no husband present, and 37.2% were non-families. 33.0% of all households were made up of individuals, and 18.4% had someone living alone who was 65 years of age or older.  The average household size was 2.21 and the average family size was 2.77.

In the township the population was spread out, with 21.0% under the age of 18, 6.4% from 18 to 24, 27.9% from 25 to 44, 24.8% from 45 to 64, and 19.8% who were 65 years of age or older.  The median age was 42 years. For every 100 females, there were 102.9 males.  For every 100 females age 18 and over, there were 105.3 males.

The median income for a household in the township was $32,917, and the median income for a family was $38,500. Males had a median income of $35,795 versus $18,750 for females. The per capita income for the township was $18,796.  About 2.4% of families and 5.5% of the population were below the poverty line, including 4.1% of those under age 18 and 14.0% of those age 65 or over.

References

Populated places established in 1810
Townships in McKean County, Pennsylvania
Townships in Pennsylvania